The Verdun Juniors were a junior ice hockey team in the Quebec Major Junior Hockey League from 1982 to 1984. They played at the Verdun Auditorium.

History
The Verdun Juniors were assembled by general manager Eric Taylor, and coached by Pierre Creamer.  Verdun won the Presidents Trophy in the 1982-83 season as playoff champions, defeating the Trois-Rivières Draveurs, Shawinigan Cataractes and the Longueuil Chevaliers.

The Juniors would compete in the Memorial Cup that year versus the Lethbridge Broncos, Portland Winter Hawks and the Oshawa Generals. Verdun would lose 7-6 to Portland, defeat Lethbridge 4-3, lose 5-1 to Oshawa, and lose 6-5 to Oshawa in the semi-final game, ending their hopes of a Memorial Cup championship.

After two very successful seasons, the team revived its old name to become the Verdun Jr. Canadiens.

Players
Pat LaFontaine scored 104 goals and 130 assists for 234 points in the 1982-83 season, his only season in major junior hockey, winning the Jean Béliveau Trophy as the top scorer, out-dueling future NHL icon Mario Lemieux. Two of the more prominent records he broke were Guy Lafleur's 40-game point-scoring streak and Mike Bossy's 70 goals by a rookie.

He was awarded the Michel Brière Commemorative Trophy as the MVP of the regular season, the Guy Lafleur Trophy as the MVP of the playoffs, the Michel Bergeron Trophy as the Offensive Rookie of the Year, the Mike Bossy Trophy as the best professional prospect, and the Frank J. Selke Commemorative Trophy as the Most sportsmanlike player. Also in 1982-1983 Pat LaFontaine was chosen Canadian Hockey League Player of the Year. Pat would be inducted into the Hockey Hall of Fame in 2003.

Also of note, is alumnus Claude Lemieux, who would play almost 1200 NHL games. He scored 379 goals, and won 4 Stanley Cups in   1986 (Montreal), 1995 (New Jersey), 1996 (Colorado) & 2000 (New Jersey).

Billy Campbell was awarded the Emile Bouchard Trophy as the Defenceman of the year in the 1983-84 season. Jérôme Carrier was awarded the Frank J. Selke Commemorative Trophy as the Most sportsmanlike player in 1983-1984.

NHL alumni

Yearly Results

Regular season

Playoffs
1982-83 Defeated Trois-Rivières Draveurs 4 games to 0 in quarter-finals. Defeated Shawinigan Cataractes 4 games to 2 in semi-finals. Defeated Longueuil Chevaliers 4 games to 1 in finals. QMJHL CHAMPIONS Lost to Oshawa Generals 6-5 in the semi-final game of the Memorial Cup.  
1983-84 Defeated St.-Jean Castors 4 games to 0 in quarter-finals. Lost to Longueuil Chevaliers 4 games to 2 in semi-finals.

Defunct Quebec Major Junior Hockey League teams
Verdun, Quebec
Ice hockey clubs established in 1982
Sports clubs disestablished in 1984
1982 establishments in Quebec
1984 disestablishments in Quebec